Scott Draper was the defending champion but lost in the third round to Sargis Sargsian.

Pete Sampras won in the final 6–7(1–7), 6–4, 7–6(7–4) against Tim Henman.

This was the only year in which Roger Federer competed in this tournament.

Seeds
The top eight seeds received a bye to the second round.

  Yevgeny Kafelnikov (second round)
  Pete Sampras (champion)
  Tim Henman (final)
  Mark Philippoussis (third round)
  Todd Martin (third round)
  Karol Kučera (quarterfinals)
  Greg Rusedski (quarterfinals)
  Goran Ivanišević (quarterfinals)
  Thomas Enqvist (first round)
  Wayne Ferriera (third round)
  Cédric Pioline (quarterfinals)
  Jason Stoltenberg (third round)
  Byron Black (third round)
  Lleyton Hewitt (semifinals)
  Scott Draper (third round)
  Fabrice Santoro (first round)

Draw

Finals

Top half

Section 1

Section 2

Bottom half

Section 3

Section 4

External links 
 1999 Stella Artois Championships draw

Singles